Sutrio is a comune (municipality) in the Province of Udine in the Italian region Friuli-Venezia Giulia, located about  northwest of Trieste and about  northwest of Udine.

The municipality of Sutrio contains the frazioni (subdivisions, mainly villages and hamlets) Nojaris and Priola.

Sutrio borders the following municipalities: Arta Terme, Cercivento, Lauco, Ovaro, Paluzza, Ravascletto, Zuglio.

Demographic evolution

References

External links
 www.comune.sutrio.ud.it/

Cities and towns in Friuli-Venezia Giulia